Go Straight is a 1921 American silent drama film directed by William Worthington and starring Frank Mayo,  Cora Drew and Lillian Rich.

Cast
 Frank Mayo as Reverend Keith Rollins
 Cora Drew as Mrs. Conners
 Harry Carter as Hellfire Gibbs
 Lillian Rich as Hope Gibbs
 George F. Marion as Jim Boyd
 Lassie Young as Laura Boyd
Charles Brinley as Buck Stevens

References

Bibliography
 Connelly, Robert B. The Silents: Silent Feature Films, 1910-36, Volume 40, Issue 2. December Press, 1998.
 Munden, Kenneth White. The American Film Institute Catalog of Motion Pictures Produced in the United States, Part 1. University of California Press, 1997.

External links
 

1921 films
1921 drama films
1920s English-language films
American silent feature films
Silent American drama films
Films directed by William Worthington
American black-and-white films
Universal Pictures films
1920s American films